Severino Aguilar Fruto (born 8 July 1936) is a Panamanian wrestler. He competed in the 1968 Summer Olympics.

References

1936 births
Living people
Wrestlers at the 1968 Summer Olympics
Panamanian male sport wrestlers
Olympic wrestlers of Panama
Sportspeople from Colón, Panama
Pan American Games medalists in wrestling
Pan American Games bronze medalists for Panama
Wrestlers at the 1967 Pan American Games
20th-century Panamanian people
21st-century Panamanian people